The Institute for Contemporary Art is a transnational research centre focused on East European art and ecology and operates across the fields of art history, contemporary art and ecological thought.  The institute collaborates with universities and art spaces both in Central Europe and across the continent.

Founded in 2013 in Budapest, the institute has been operating since 2018 from London.  Its co-directors are Drs. Maja and Reuben Fowkes

Aims 

The original idea for Translocal reflects the experience of 'being intensely present in a plurality of localities while also adopting a perspective that goes beyond any particular local or national frame,' and the understanding that to preserve a 'position of criticality and mobility you cannot be closed into one geopolitical space.'

Activities 

The institute programs  include an Experimental Reading Room involving both a series of Anthropocene Response lectures by prominent theorists and Reading Group seminars dealing with Art and the Anthropocene.

The River School was based on engaging with the Danube River as a transforming natural environment through a series of workshops, symposia, exhibitions and excursions to urban and natural wilderness.

Publications 

The Institute has released the following books and exhibition catalogues:

 River Ecologies: Contemporary Art and Environmental Humanities on the Danube (2015)
 Loophole to Happiness (2011)
 Revolutionary Decadence (2009)
 Revolution I Love You (2008)
 Revolution is not a Garden Party (2007)
 Unframed Landscapes (2004)

library 

The Institute library is specialised on art and ecology, as well as East European art history, and a resource for international researchers working in these fields.

References

External links
Translocal Institute for Contemporary Art website
Experimental Reading Room
Arts organizations established in 2013
Arts organisations based in the United Kingdom